Radiarctia jacksoni is a moth of the family Erebidae first described by Walter Rothschild in 1910. It is found in Ethiopia, Kenya, Zaire and Tanzania.

The larvae feed on Commelina, Aster, Bidens pilosa, Galimsoga parviflora, Zinnia, Boerhavia and Solanum.

References

Moths described in 1910
Spilosomina
Moths of Africa